Mfon Sunday Udoka (born June 16, 1976) is a Nigerian-American former professional basketball player who is  an assistant coach for the Nigeria women's national basketball team, the D'Tigress.  Born in Portland, Oregon, Udoka graduated from Benson Polytechnic High School (1994) in Portland before attending DePaul University in Chicago, Illinois from 1994 to 1998. She is the older sister of coach and former NBA player Ime Udoka.

1998-2003
After leaving DePaul in 1998, Udoka signed with the Detroit Shock of the WNBA. With Detroit, she appeared in three games. Udoka left the U.S. following the 1998 season, moving to Portugal for the 1998–99 season. She returned to school to complete her degree in Communications in 2000, and also rehabilitated her ACL injury she suffered in the summer of 1999.  In 2001, she slowly resumed her basketball career with the Birmingham Power of the National Women's Basketball League. Following the end of the 2001 NWBL season, Udoka again left the U.S., moving to Israel, where she played briefly with Electra Ramat HaSharon before moving to compete with Harbin in China for the 2002 season. For the 2003 season, Udoka went back to Harbin before playing with the Chicago Blaze, again of the NWBL.  In 2003, she was invited to the Houston Comets training camp and made the roster as a free agent.

2003-2004
Taking several years away from the WNBA, Udoka returned in 2003 with the Houston Comets. With the Comets, she played in 25 games and started 3 of them, averaging 3.2 points per game in 10 minutes. Udoka signed with the Los Angeles Sparks for the short remainder of the 2004 WNBA season, after competing for Nigeria in the Athens Olympics, but played in only 3 games.

2004-2007
After leaving Los Angeles, Udoka moved to Spain (2004), then the Athens Summer Olympics and Russia(2005). She played in Mersin, Turkey for the second half of the 2006 season and spent a short time with Tarbes Gespe Bigorre of France's Ligue Féminine de Basketball in 2007.

International competitions
Udoka led the Nigeria women's national basketball team to the 2004 Summer Olympics. At the Olympics, she was second in the tournament in scoring and rebounding but Nigeria finished 11th out of 12 teams. They became the first African team to ever win a game at the Olympics.  Udoka also led Nigeria at the 2006 FIBA World Championship for Women, where Nigeria finished in last (16th) place.

In May 2011, Udoka was named as the new Assistant Coach for the Nigeria women's national basketball team D'Tigress as they prepare for the African Nations Cup in Mali and the All Africa Games.

References

External links 
 
 

1982 births
Living people
American expatriate basketball people in France
American expatriate basketball people in Israel
Nigerian women's basketball players
Nigerian women's basketball coaches
Basketball players at the 2004 Summer Olympics
Basketball players from Portland, Oregon
Benson Polytechnic High School alumni
DePaul Blue Demons women's basketball players
Detroit Shock players
Houston Comets players
Los Angeles Sparks players
Nigerian expatriate basketball people in France
Nigerian expatriate basketball people in Israel
Nigerian expatriate basketball people in China
Olympic basketball players of Nigeria
Sportspeople from Portland, Oregon
Tarbes Gespe Bigorre players
African Games silver medalists for Nigeria
African Games medalists in basketball
African Games gold medalists for Nigeria
Heilongjiang Dragons players
American expatriate basketball people in China
Competitors at the 2003 All-Africa Games
African Americans in Oregon
Forwards (basketball)